Events in the year 1986 in Portugal.

Incumbents
President: António Ramalho Eanes (until 9 March), Mário Soares (since 9 March)
Prime Minister: Aníbal Cavaco Silva

Events
 1 January - Portugal becomes a member state of the European Union.
 26 January - First round of the Presidential election.
 16 February - Second round of the Presidential election.

Arts and entertainment
Portugal participated in the Eurovision Song Contest 1986 with Dora and the song "Não sejas mau para mim".

Sports
In association football, for the first-tier league seasons, see 1985–86 Primeira Divisão and 1986–87 Primeira Divisão.

References

 
Portugal
Years of the 20th century in Portugal
Portugal